Kirby Battle Royale is a brawler multiplayer video game in the Kirby series. Developed by HAL Laboratory and published by Nintendo, the game was released on the Nintendo 3DS handheld game console in Europe and Japan in November 2017, and in North America in January 2018.

Gameplay
Kirby Battle Royale is a party/arena fighting game video game played primarily from a top-down perspective. Players control the series' titular protagonist Kirby and must battle against other versions of himself in an arena. The game features a single-player story campaign along with cooperative play and multiplayer battle modes that are available to play locally and online.

Game modes
There are a total of 10 game modes plus "The Cake Royale" story mode.
 The Cake Royale: Dedede sets up a tournament full of colored Kirby clones. Kirby fights through, playing different game modes through five "leagues."
 Battle Arena: The player must defeat all of the opponents and be the last one standing. However, the opposing players can revive given enough time.
 Apple Scramble: Players split into two teams and must harvest and collect more apples than the opponent.
 Coin Clash: Players must collect the most coins in the set time limit while avoiding a coin-draining ghost.
 Attack Riders: Players must collect "chips" by hitting other players. Machines appear at times, and attacking while on it results in the player getting extra chips.
 Crazy Theater: Players must clear a certain task before the opponents, including tasks like "carry X apples", "attack your rivals", and "Avoid the [bomb] blast."
 Rocket Rumble: Players collect fuel cubes and try to get them in their ships. The more cubes, the higher the rocket goes. To win, the player must fly the highest.
 Robo Bonkers: Players must attack a robotic version of Bonkers. To win, they must deal the most damage.
 Slam Hockey: The players must attack a giant hockey puck and knock it at the opponents to score.
 Ore Express: Players must collect ore and throw it in a passing train. The player who collects the most ore wins.
 Flag Ball: The players must throw a ball at their flag to score, but the opposing team can carry the flag and attack the player. The team who scores seven goals first wins.

Abilities
The abilities featured in game, in order of listing, are: Sword, Bomb, Beetle, Spear, Cutter, Fighter, Ninja, Whip, Parasol, Hammer, Doctor, Tornado, and Ice, as well as Mirror and Sleep, which were introduced in a free update for the game. Alongside the 15 base abilities, 3 other playable characters are in the game: Waddle Dee, Meta Knight, and King Dedede. The 3 characters function similarly to the Parasol, Sword, and Hammer abilities respectively (albeit with a few unique moves).

Prior to the game's release, a copy ability poll was held. People could vote for their favorite ability, and the winner was the Mirror ability. A second poll was held in December. 13 of the abilities were available upon initial launch, with Mirror being made available via free software update in Europe and Japan, and Sleep was made available via another software update; both poll winners have been made available in North America via a free software update as well.

Development and release 
Kirby Battle Royale was developed by HAL Laboratory and published by Nintendo. The game was announced in September 2017 during a Nintendo Direct and is part of Kirbys 25th anniversary celebration.

On 19 October 2017, a demo was released in Europe on the Nintendo eShop. The demo included three playable game modes and unlocks access to the character Meta Knight in the full game via a save transfer. The demo was later released on 4 January 2018 in North America.

The game was released for the Nintendo 3DS handheld game console on 3 November 2017 in Europe, on 30 November in Japan, and was released on 19 January 2018 in North America. It sold 28,023 copies within its first week on sales in Japan.

Reception

Kirby Battle Royale received "mixed or average" reviews from professional critics according to review aggregator website Metacritic. Famitsu gave it a positive score of 30 out of 40.

Notes

References

External links
 
 Kirby Battle Royale at MobyGames

2017 video games
Fighting games
3D fighting games
Kirby (series) video games
Party video games
Multiplayer and single-player video games
HAL Laboratory games
Nintendo 3DS eShop games
Nintendo 3DS games
Nintendo 3DS-only games
Nintendo Network games
Video games developed in Japan
Video games that use Amiibo figurines
Video games scored by Shogo Sakai